Chodang Station is a station of the Everline in Jung-dong, Giheung-gu, Yongin, South Korea.

External links
  Station information from Everline

Everline
Metro stations in Yongin
Railway stations opened in 2013